Limerick is an unincorporated community in Jackson Township, Jackson County, Ohio, United States.

The Limerick Post Office was established on May 27, 1880 and discontinued on February 13, 1904.  The mail service is currently handled through the Jackson Post Office.

References 

Unincorporated communities in Jackson County, Ohio